Wacey Rabbit (born November 16, 1986) is a Canadian former professional ice hockey centre who played in the American Hockey League (AHL) and current assistant coach of the Saskatoon Blades of the Western Hockey League (WHL).

Playing career
Rabbit played major junior in the Western Hockey League (WHL). During his draft year in 2004–05, he recorded 67 points and was then selected in the 5th round, 154th overall, by the Boston Bruins in the 2005 NHL Entry Draft. Rabbit turned pro in 2006–07 season with Boston's American Hockey League (AHL) affiliate, the Providence Bruins. However, after he was demoted to the ECHL in January, Vancouver Giants general manager Scott Bonner requested that the Boston Bruins send Rabbit back down to junior to bolster the Giants for the 2007 Memorial Cup. Rabbit was then traded from the Saskatoon Blades for Kenton Dulle and a second-round pick in the 2008 WHL Bantam Draft.

Returning to the WHL, Rabbit helped the 2007 Memorial Cup hosts, the Vancouver Giants, to the WHL Finals against the Medicine Hat Tigers with 20 points in 22 games, but they were defeated in seven games. In the subsequent Memorial Cup, the Giants met the Tigers again in the final game and won the CHL title.

In 2007–08, Rabbit returned to Providence and recorded 26 points in 66 games. The following season, he improved to 34 points in 74 games. After the Bruins declined to extend his contract in the 2009 off-season, he was signed by the Nashville Predators AHL affiliate, the Milwaukee Admirals on October 2, 2009. In the 2009–10 season, Rabbit appeared in 76 games with the Admirals, posting a professional career-low of 18 points.

Without an NHL offer, Rabbit left North America and secured a try-out as a free agent with Croatian team KHL Medveščak of the Erste Bank Hockey League on August 30, 2010. After only a week on trial on September 7, 2010, Rabbit was signed by Medveščak to a one-year contract with an optional second year.

Wacey played with the Florida Panthers AHL affiliate, the San Antonio Rampage, during the 2011–12 season, helping them qualify for the Calder cup playoffs and beat the Chicago Wolves in the first round.

On June 21, 2012, Rabbit returned to Europe, signing a contract with Norwegian club, Lørenskog IK of the GET-ligaen. After three standout seasons in Norway, Rabbit left as a free agent to sign a one-year contract with Japanese club, Nippon Paper Cranes of the Asia League Ice Hockey (ALIH) on July 28, 2015.

After a further season in Italy with HC Pustertal Wölfe of the Alps Hockey League, Rabbit returned to play in North America for the first time in five years, in accepting an ECHL contract to play with new entrant the Jacksonville Icemen on August 31, 2017. Rabbit played in just 2 games to open the 2017–18 season with the Icemen before opting to return to Europe in agreeing to a one-year deal with Czech club, HC Dukla Jihlava on November 21, 2017.

At the conclusion of the season, Rabbit returned to North America as a free agent and later re-united with the Jacksonville Icemen, agreeing to a one-year deal on August 14, 2018.

After 15 professional seasons, Rabbit announced his retirement from professional hockey on August 26, 2021.

Coaching career
After serving as an assistant coach of the Alberni Valley Bulldogs of the British Columbia Hockey League (BCHL), Rabbit joined the staff of the Saskatoon Blades as an assistant coach on June 27, 2022.

Personal life
Rabbit, of First Nations descent, was born in Lethbridge, Alberta and raised in the nearby Kainai Nation in southern Alberta.

Career statistics

Regular season and playoffs

International

Awards and honours

References

External links

1986 births
Living people
Boston Bruins draft picks
Canadian ice hockey centres
Cincinnati Cyclones (ECHL) players
HC Dukla Jihlava players
First Nations sportspeople
Ice hockey people from Alberta
Jacksonville Icemen players
KHL Medveščak Zagreb players
Lørenskog IK players
Milwaukee Admirals players
Nippon Paper Cranes players
Providence Bruins players
HC Pustertal Wölfe players
San Antonio Rampage players
Saskatoon Blades players
Sportspeople from Lethbridge
Vancouver Giants players
Canadian expatriate ice hockey players in the Czech Republic
Canadian expatriate ice hockey players in Croatia
Canadian expatriate ice hockey players in Norway
Canadian expatriate ice hockey players in Italy
Canadian expatriate ice hockey players in the United States
Canadian expatriate ice hockey players in Japan
Canadian expatriate ice hockey players in Romania